Gérard Fenouil (born 23 June 1945) is a former athlete from France who mainly competed in the 100 metres.

Born in Paris, he competed for France in the 1968 Summer Olympics held in Mexico City, Mexico, where he won the bronze medal in the 4 x 100 metre relay with his team mates Jocelyn Delecour, Claude Piquemal and Roger Bambuck.

References

Sports Reference

1945 births
French male sprinters
Athletes (track and field) at the 1968 Summer Olympics
Athletes (track and field) at the 1972 Summer Olympics
Olympic athletes of France
Olympic bronze medalists for France
Living people
Athletes from Paris
European Athletics Championships medalists
Medalists at the 1968 Summer Olympics
Olympic bronze medalists in athletics (track and field)